The British Columbia Recall and Initiative Referendum was a referendum held in British Columbia on October 17, 1991. It was concurrent with that year's general election. The referendum posed two questions. They were on whether elected officials should be able to be recalled and whether voters should be given a citizen's initiative. Both questions were decisively approved with over 80% of the electorate voting yes to both questions.

Lead up 
British Columbia has had several referendums in its history. A previous bill, the Direct Legislation Act, was passed by the Oliver government in 1919. the Direct Democracy Act was given royal assent in March of that year, but was never proclaimed. A similar statute was struck down by the Manitoba Court of Appeals later that year. These combined to leave the BC law in legislative limbo until it was removed in a 1924 statute consolidation.

A promise to hold referendums was included in the British Columbia Social Credit Party (Socred) government's speech from the throne in April 1990. In preparation, the Socreds had invited two experts from California familiar with recall and initiative to their annual convention. Appropriate legislation was introduced on July 5, 1990.

The two questions were:

A: Should the voters be given the right, by legislation, to vote between elections for the removal of their member of the Legislative Assembly?

B: Should the voters be given the right, by legislation, to propose questions that the Government of British Columbia must submit to voters by referendum?

Both of the questions were announced by Premier Rita Johnston during a news conference on September 5, 1991, although by then they were an open secret. NDP leader Mike Harcourt criticized the timing, saying that the Socreds had moved too slowly in launching the proposals. Liberal leader Gordon Wilson also criticized the referendum, saying that it was intended to divert attention away from the scandal-plagued Socreds. In response, Johnston said she could not comment on either timing or structure for the proposals because they would be decided after the referendum.

The referendum was run by Attorney-General Russ Fraser. The total cost was 1.7 million dollars. The cost includes information pamphlets, advertising, toll-free information telephone lines, and costs related to running the referendum.

The referendum also got caught up in the campaign going on at the same time. Both Premier Johnston and British Columbia New Democratic Party (NDP) leader Harcourt announced that they would be voting yes in the referendum.

Results 
There was overwhelming support for both questions. Support was over 80% of yes votes for both questions. However, more than nine percent of ballots for question A were rejected, and more than eleven percent were rejected for question B. Turnout was slightly less than that in the general election.

Question A: Recall

Question B: Initiative

Aftermath 
British Columbia's legislation made a referendum binding only on the government that called it. As the Socreds had been defeated, the incoming NDP government was not required to enable recall and initiative. Nevertheless, Premier-elect Mike Harcourt announced that his government would be bound by the results. As a consequence, the Recall and Initiative Act was passed and entered into force on February 24, 1995.
In 1998, MLA Paul Reitsma resigned his seat when it appeared that a recall petition would be successful and he could be the first person ever recalled under the legislation.

See also 
 Politics of British Columbia
 Referendums in Canada
 William Aberhart, the first politician in Canada ever to be subject to a recall campaign

References

External links 
 Elections BC

1991 elections in Canada
Political history of British Columbia
1991 referendums
Elections in British Columbia
Initiatives
1991 in British Columbia
October 1991 events in Canada